Hypolimnas octocula marianensis, known as the Mariana eight-spot butterfly or forest flicker, is a subspecies of Hypolimnas octocula, the eight-spot butterfly.

The species is in found on Guam and Saipan in the Mariana Islands and feeds on two host plants: Procris pedunculata and Elatostema calcareum. These two herbs grow only on karst limestone forest.  It occurs with certainty only on Guam and is a candidate for listing under the Endangered Species Act.  The Mariana eight-spot butterfly suffers from numerous threats, including habitat destruction, competition from introduced species and increased predation from ants and wasps.

References

octocula marianensis
Insects of Oceania
ESA endangered species
Butterfly subspecies